Erin Yvette is an American voice actress best known for her roles in character driven, narrative-heavy video games like Snow White in The Wolf Among Us by Telltale Games, Alex in Night School Studio’s debut Oxenfree and Chelsea Stevens in Campo Santo's debut Firewatch. She has voiced new champions and skins in games like Fortnite, Paladins, Smite and Vainglory. She has also voiced characters for other Telltale games, including Molly and Bonnie in The Walking Dead, Sasha in Tales from the Borderlands, various voices in Minecraft: Story Mode and Vicki Vale in Batman: The Telltale Series.

Outside of video games, she can be heard singing for children's toys and animation and speaking in various car, fashion and tech commercials.

Filmography

Live-action

Animation

Anime

Video games

Awards and nominations

References

External links
 

Living people
American voice actresses
American stage actresses
Place of birth missing (living people)
American video game actresses
21st-century American women
1992 births